North Carolina Highway 21 (NC 21) was a primary state highway in the U.S. state of North Carolina. Originally, NC 21 began at the South Carolina state line west of Fair Bluff. The highway travelled north connecting Lumberton, Fayetteville, and Lillington before ending in Raleigh. By 1926, the highway was realigned south of Fayetteville, beginning in Whiteville and running north through Elizabethtown and Dublin before reaching Fayetteville. The highway was realigned once again in 1929, replacing NC 231 from Elizabethtown to U.S. Route 17/NC 20 near Delco and being routed north of Raleigh to US 15/NC 75 Creedmoor.

Route description
NC 21 began at US 17/NC 20 east of Delco. The highway ran  to the northwest to Elizabethtown, largely paralleling the Cape Fear River north of Acme. NC 21 intersected US 701/NC 23 in Elizabethtown. From Elizabethtown, NC 21 ran west through Dublin, intersecting NC 201 northwest of the town. From NC 201, the highway continued north for  through Tarheel to Fayetteville. In Fayetteville, NC 21 began a concurrency with US 401 to Raleigh. The US 401/US 421/NC 21/NC 60/NC 210 concurrency crossed the Cape Fear River and the highways split at an intersection north of the bridge. From the intersection US 401/NC 21 continued north, entering Wake County near Fuquay Springs.

History
NC 21 was established in 1921 as an original North Carolina state highway. At the time of establishment, the highway ran from South Carolina Highway 47 (SC 47) to NC 10 in Raleigh. The highway traveled through Lumberton, Fayetteville, and Lillington between its termini.

By 1926, NC 21 was rerouted south of Fayetteville. The southern terminus was moved to NC 20 in Whiteville. NC 21 traveled north through Clarkton to Elizabethtown, where it turned to the northwest toward Fayetteville. The NC 21 realignment largely replaced NC 22 south of Fayetteville. The former alignment of NC 21 between South Carolina and Fayetteville became part of NC 22. The southern terminus was moved to the east by 1929, instead ending at US 74/NC 20 near Delco. The highway replaced  of NC 231 between Delco and Elizabethtown. The former routing of NC 21 between Whiteville and Elizabethtown was renumbered as part of NC 23.

By 1935, NC 21 was completely decommissioned. The route between Delco and Fayetteville became NC 28. The NC 21 was removed from the US 401 concurrency between Fayetteville and Raleigh, and NC 13 was signed between Raleigh and Creedmoor.

Junction list

References

021
U.S. Route 15